Axel Auriant (born 1 January 1998) is a French actor and drummer. He is known for his role as Lucas Lallement in the French-Belgian TV drama series Skam France.

Early life
Auriant was born on 1 January 1998 in Besançon. He studied at the École Alsacienne in Paris.

He started working in theatre drama in 2010, as part of the acting company Les Sales Gosses ('The Bad Boys') – a professional children's acting company. There, he met and worked with Olivier Solivérés, an author and director who, a few years later, gave him a role in his work Au pays du Père Noël ('In the Land of Father Christmas') in the Théâtre des Mathurins. He played this role for two years.

Career
He decided to become a professional actor when he was about 16 years old, as a result of learning about Molière in literature classes at school. In 2016, he joined the Municipal Conservatoire Jaccques Ibert (affiliated with the Paris Conservatory) in the 19th arrondissement of Paris.

At the age of 19, Axel Auriant made his mark in theatre in the one-man show Une vie sur mesure ('A Unique Life') by Cédric Chapuis. The show won the Etoile du Parisien award for best play of 2017.

He played Lucas in the French adaptation of the Norwegian teen drama Skam. His character was the protagonist of the third series, which was released in 2019. Upon this series' release, Skam France became the most watched online drama in France. It propelled Axel Auriant, as well as his on-screen counterpart Maxence Danet-Fauvel, to an international level.

By the age of 21, Axel Auriant had made more than 500 appearances on stage.

In 2020, he appeared in Charlène Favier's Slalom, which was officially selected for the 2020 Cannes Film Festival, the 2020 Angoulême Film Festival and the Ornano-Valenti Prize at the 46th Deauville American Film Festival. Also in 2020, he took part in a advertising campaign for Cartier directed by Cédric Klapisch.

As well as being a professional actor, Axel Auriant is also a professional drummer. He began drumming in 2003.

Filmography

Cinema 
 2015: Nos futurs ('Our Futures') directed by Rémi Bezançon: Léo
 2016:  ('Never Happy') directed by Émilie Deleuze: Tom
 2020: Slalom directed by Charlène Favier: Maximillien
 2021:  ('The Living Hands') directed by Arthur Dupont: Jacques

Television 
 2014:  ('Our Dear Neighbours') directed by Roger Delattre: Jérémy
 2014: Fais pas ci, fais pas ça ('Don't Do This, Don't Do That') directed by Laurent Tuel
 2018:  ('Murders in Lille') directed by Laurence Katrian: Oscar d'Armentières
 2018-2020: Skam France directed by David Hourrège: Lucas Lallemant
 2019: Nina (TV series) directed by Eric Le Roux
 2021:  directed by Christophe Campos: Felix

Dubbing work 
(The year given is when the dubbed work was released, not necessarily the same as the original)
 2017:  directed by : Erdewan
 2019: Dumbo directed by Tim Burton: extra voice
 2019: Spider-Man: Far From Home directed by Jon Watts: Zach
 2021: JoJo's Bizarre Adventure: BabyHead (TV animé series)

Theatre 
 2008: Salles Gosses Show ('Bad Boys Show') by Sylvie Ferrié and Philippe Bretin at Le Divan du Monde and 
 2015-2016: Au pays du Père Noël ('In the Land of Santa Claus') stage production by the author Olivier Solivérès, played at the Théâtre des Mathurins
 2016:  ('The Little Ways') by Eugène Labiche, stage production by Loïc Berger
 2017-2019: Une vie sur mesure by Cédric Chapuis, stage production by Stéphane Batle, played at the Théâtre Tristan-Bernard
 2019-2020: Les 1001 Vies des Urgences by Baptiste Beaulieu, stage production by Arthur Jugnot, played at the théâtre des Béliers parisiens and the 
2021: Times Square by Clément Koch, stage production by José Paul, played at the Théâtre de la Michodière (filmed for the France 2 TV channel)

Awards 
 2018: Étoile du Parisien - Play of the Year for Une vie sur mesure by Cédric Chapuis

References 
Notes

Citations

1998 births
French drummers
21st-century French male actors
French male film actors
French male stage actors
French male television actors
French male voice actors
Living people
People from Besançon